Protopeltis is a genus of beetles. It contains two species native to New Zealand. It was formerly considered a member of Trogossitidae, but is currently placed as the only member of the family Protopeltidae within the Cleroidea. The larvae have been collected from the fungus infested bark of dead Nothofagus trees. Adult gut contents indicate that they are mycophagous, feeding on probably Hymenochaete fungi. This is also presumably true for the larvae.

References 

Cleroidea genera
Beetles described in 1964